Scripps League Newspapers, Inc. was a newspaper publishing company in the United States founded by Josephine Scripps in 1921 and managed beginning in 1931 by her son Ed Scripps (1909-1997). Based in Herndon, Virginia, the chain was separate from the larger E. W. Scripps Company begun by Ed's grandfather, Edward Willis Scripps.

The chain eventually grew to 51 small newspapers including The Daily Herald of Provo, Utah; Napa Valley Register of Napa, Calif.; Newport Daily Express of Newport, Vt., The Hanford Sentinel of Hanford, Calif., Arizona Daily Sun of Flagstaff, Ariz., and Haverhill Gazette in Massachusetts.

Pulitzer Publishing Company bought Scripps League for about $230 million in 1996. In 2005, Lee Enterprises bought the Pulitzer newspaper division.

References

Defunct newspaper companies of the United States
Companies based in Virginia
Lee Enterprises publications
Scripps family
Publishing companies established in 1921
Mass media companies disestablished in 1996
1921 establishments in Virginia
1996 disestablishments in Virginia
1996 mergers and acquisitions